Paul P. Boswell (June 12, 1905 – March 3, 1982) was an American politician and medical doctor.

Boswell was born in Pittsburgh, Pennsylvania. He went to Central High School in Minneapolis, Minnesota. Boswell was an African-American. He graduated from Lincoln University in 1929 and University of Minnesota Medical School in 1939. He practiced medicine in Chicago, Illinois at Michael Reese Hospital. Boswell served in the Illinois House of Representatives in 1965 and 1966 and was a Republican. Boswell died at Michael Reese Hospital and Medical Center in Chicago, Illinois.

Notes

1905 births
1982 deaths
Politicians from Chicago
Politicians from Minneapolis
Politicians from Pittsburgh
Lincoln University (Pennsylvania) alumni
University of Minnesota Medical School alumni
Physicians from Illinois
Republican Party members of the Illinois House of Representatives
African-American state legislators in Illinois
20th-century American politicians
20th-century African-American politicians
African-American men in politics